Vithoon Kijmongkolsak (Thai: วิฑูรย์ กิจมงคลศักดิ์, born June 21, 1962 in Nakhon Sawan) is a Thai retired footballer and former Thailand national team captain. He played for the national team from 1985 to 1995.

References

1962 births
Living people
Vithoon Kijmongkolsak
Vithoon Kijmongkolsak
1992 AFC Asian Cup players
Association football forwards
Penang F.C. players
Footballers at the 1990 Asian Games
Vithoon Kijmongkolsak
Vithoon Kijmongkolsak
Vithoon Kijmongkolsak
Southeast Asian Games medalists in football
Competitors at the 1987 Southeast Asian Games
Vithoon Kijmongkolsak
Thai expatriate sportspeople in Malaysia
Vithoon Kijmongkolsak
Vithoon Kijmongkolsak
Sri Pahang FC players